Kenny de Schepper was the defending champion but lost in the quarterfinals to Pedro Sousa.

Sousa won the title after defeating Marco Cecchinato 1–6, 6–2, 6–4 in the final.

Seeds

Draw

Finals

Top half

Bottom half

References
Main Draw
Qualifying Draw

Città di Como Challenger - Singles
2017 Singles